Carrowclare is a small village and townland in County Londonderry, Northern Ireland. In the 2001 Census it had a population of 129 people. It is situated within Causeway Coast and Glens district.

It is also the name of a townland in County Sligo, Republic of Ireland.

See also 
List of villages in Northern Ireland

References 

NI Neighbourhood Information System

Villages in County Londonderry
Causeway Coast and Glens district